Aslauga vininga, the central aslauga, is a butterfly in the family Lycaenidae. It is found in Nigeria, Cameroon, Equatorial Guinea (Bioko), Gabon, the Republic of the Congo, the Democratic Republic of the Congo, Tanzania and Zambia.

Adults have been recorded on wing in March.

The larvae are carnivorous and have been found feeding on Dactylopius longispinus and Lecanium punctuliferum var. lamborni and are associated with the ant species Crematogater buchneri race laurenti.

Subspecies
Aslauga vininga vininga (eastern Nigeria, Cameroon, Equatorial Guinea: Bioko, Gabon, Congo, Democratic Republic of the Congo: Tshopo, Tshuapa, Sankuru and Lualaba)
Aslauga vininga kiellandi Libert, 1997 (north-western Tanzania, Zambia)

References

External links
Images representing Aslauga vininga at Barcodes of Life
Seitz, A. Die Gross-Schmetterlinge der Erde 13: Die Afrikanischen Tagfalter. Plate XIII 65 f

Butterflies described in 1875
Aslauga
Butterflies of Africa
Taxa named by William Chapman Hewitson